The San Lucan gecko (Phyllodactylus unctus) is a species of gecko. It is endemic to Mexico.

References

Phyllodactylus
Reptiles of Mexico
Reptiles described in 1864